Vasili Semenovich Sorokin (1833–1918) was a Russian mosaics artist.  He studied at the Imperial Academy of Arts in Saint Petersburg; among his works are mosaics for the Church of St. Isaac in Moscow.

Sorokin was the brother of painters Pavel and Evgraf Sorokin.

References
John Milner.  A Dictionary of Russian and Soviet Artists, 1420 - 1970.  Woodbridge, Suffolk; Antique Collectors' Club, 1993

1833 births
1918 deaths
Russian artists
Mosaic artists